Nichts Muss is an album by the German musician Barbara Morgenstern.

Track listing
"Aus Heiterem Himmel" (Out of the blue) – 4:25
"Nichts und Niemand" (Nothing and nobody) – 3:57
"Ohne Abstand" (Without distance) – 3:54
"Nichts Muss" (Nothing has to be) – 8:06
"Merci (Dass Es Dich Gibt)" (Merci (That You Are)) – 4:29
"Kleiner Ausschnitt" (Small clip) – 3:21
"Move" – 3:05
"We're All Gonna Fucking Die" – 3:33
"Is" – 3:05
"Gute Nacht" (Good night) – 3:44
"Reset" – 5:44

References 

2004 albums
Barbara Morgenstern albums